Bhushan Thube (born 14 April 1989) is an Indian footballer who plays as a defender for Air India FC in the I-League.

Career

Air India
After spending his youth career with Kenkre FC, Thube joined Air India, where he made his debut on 11 October 2012 during an I-League match against Pailan Arrows at the Salt Lake Stadium in Kolkata, West Bengal; Air India lost the match 2–1.

Career statistics

Club
Statistics accurate as of 12 May 2013

References

External links 
 

1989 births
Living people
I-League players
Association football defenders
Indian footballers
Air India FC players